Vithika Yadav is a human rights activist who has worked in the aspect of human trafficking, slavery, gender rights and sexual and reproductive health and rights (SRHR). She is the country head of Love Matters India which provides information about love, sex and relationships for all genders and sexualities. She is an alumnus of THNK School of Creative Leadership in Amsterdam. She is also a TedX Speaker and has delivered talks at IIT Roorkee, TEDxJIET, SIMS Pune and Hauge Academy.

Work history 
Yadav  worked as a fellow and as a consultant for Free the Slaves. She worked as a consultant to the United Nations office on drugs and crime for anti human trafficking. She worked as the project coordinator for BBC World Service Trust.

Awards and accolades 
 Winner of 120 under 40: The new generation of family planning leaders in 2016
 Winner of Atlas Corps Fellowship in 2007

References 

Indian LGBT rights activists
Living people
Indian motivational speakers
Mental health activists
Indian human rights activists
Advocates of women's reproductive rights
Women writers from Rajasthan
People from Alwar
Women motivational speakers
1980 births